The 2009 Chicago White Sox season was the organization's 110th season in Chicago and 109th in the American League. The Sox entered the 2009 season as the defending American League Central champions, attempting to repeat against the Cleveland Indians, Detroit Tigers, Kansas City Royals and Minnesota Twins. The White Sox finished the season 79–83 with third place in the American League Central,  games behind the AL Central champion Minnesota Twins, were officially eliminated from postseason contention for the first time since 2007, and failed to make the playoffs until the 2020 season.

On July 23 Mark Buehrle threw the eighteenth perfect game in Major League history, defeating the Tampa Bay Rays 5–0.

Off-season 
The Sox entered the off-season expecting to part ways with 3B Joe Crede, SS Orlando Cabrera, and CF Ken Griffey Jr. They were expected to move Rookie of the Year runner-up Alexei Ramírez to shortstop, leaving openings at second base, center field, and third base. There may also be opening in the starting rotation as José Contreras is not expected to be back until after the all-star break, as he recovers from a ruptured Achilles tendon.

 October 30, 2008 – Signed infielder Jayson Nix to a one-year deal. Declined 2009 options on catcher Toby Hall and Ken Griffey Jr.
 November 13, 2008 – Traded 1B/OF Nick Swisher and minor league pitcher Kanekoa Texeira to the New York Yankees for utility man Wilson Betemit and minor league pitchers Jeffrey Marquez and Jhonny Núñez.
 December 2, 2008 – Traded SP Javier Vázquez and RP Boone Logan to the Atlanta Braves for INF Brent Lillibridge, C Tyler Flowers, 3B Jon Gilmore, and RP Santos Rodriguez.
 December 5, 2008 – Signed pitcher John Van Benschoten to a minor league contract.
 December 12, 2008 – Signed 3B Dayán Viciedo to a four-year $10 million contract.
 January 14, 2009 – Signed SP Bartolo Colón to a one-year deal.

Spring training 
16–20–1

February 
2–2

March 
12–16–1
 Gavin Floyd re-signed with a 4-year contract worth $15.5 million on March 22.

April 
2–2

Regular season 
The White Sox started out the season against the Kansas City Royals on April 7 and they ended the season against Detroit Tigers on October 4.

Season standings

Record vs. opponents

Opening Day starting lineup 

 CF DeWayne Wise
 2B Chris Getz
 LF Carlos Quentin
 DH Jim Thome
 RF Jermaine Dye
 1B Paul Konerko
 C A. J. Pierzynski
 SS Alexei Ramírez
 3B Josh Fields
 P Mark Buehrle

April 

The White Sox started the season against the Royals on April 7 (originally scheduled for April 6 but postponed due to cold and snow), winning 4–2. On April 13 in Detroit, 3rd inning, Jermaine Dye hit his 300th career home run. The next batter, Paul Konerko, hit his 300th career home run. It is the first time in MLB history to have such a back-to-back milestone home runs, and the Sox wins it 10–6. On April 25 against the Toronto Blue Jays, Alexei Ramírez hit a grand slam as the Sox won 10–2. The White Sox finished April 11–10.

May 

On May 7 against the Detroit Tigers, Mark Buehrle pitched a no-hitter through seventh inning before Plácido Polanco hit a line-drive double to left field; however the Sox shut out the Tigers 6–0. On May 11 against the Cleveland Indians in Progressive Field, Carlos Quentin hit a slump after suffering from plantar fasciitis which hampered his swing. He was forced to miss two games as a result of the injury. On May 15–18, Sox played with Toronto Blue Jays and Sox lost all four games in Toronto for two straight years and lost 10 straight games in Toronto since June 1, 2007. On May 21 against the Minnesota Twins, the Sox had a biggest loss 20–1 since May 10, 2002, when Sox lost to Anaheim Angels 19–0 in Los Angeles. On May 24 against the Pittsburgh Pirates, in the top of the ninth inning, Jack Wilson hit his first home run of season and tied the game at 3. The next batter Nyjer Morgan hit a double and then Delwyn Young singled and Morgan scored from second and Sox trailed it 4–3. In the bottom of the ninth inning, all batters that Matt Capps faced struck out swinging. The next day in Los Angeles against the Angels, the Sox scored 17 runs in one game, the most runs since the 2006 season. Also on that day, Carlos Quentin suffered his heel injury after he hit a double and he was placed on the 15-day disabled list. The last three games of that month, Sox swept the Royals in Kansas City. The White Sox finished May 13–15.

June 

On June 1–4 against the Oakland Athletics, the Sox won the first game and lost last three, even though Oakland A's had one of the worst records in the American League, although that team is in a 7-game winning streak. On June 9 against the Detroit Tigers in the bottom of the ninth inning, bases loaded, trailing 6–4, Paul Konerko doubled down the left field line in which Scott Podsednik and Alexei Ramírez scored, but DeWayne Wise was called out at home plate even though replays showed that he looked safe since Wise's hand touched the home plate before he got tagged. The next batter, rookie Gordon Beckham struck out swinging with man on second to end the inning. In the top of the tenth inning, Miguel Cabrera hit a solo home run for a shameful loss 7–6. The Sox finished 12-game 11-day home stand with a bad record 4–8. On June 14 in Milwaukee against the Brewers, Mark Buehrle hit a solo home run in third inning. The Sox defeated the Brewers 5–4. On June 16, it was scheduled that Sox should have played with Cubs in Wrigley Field, but it was postponed due to rain, and the make-up date is announced to be September 3. On June 19 against the Reds in Cincinnati, the Sox had a first loss to Reds since 1999 and the Sox finished the record with Reds in this decade 11–1. The next day with Reds, after the third inning, Sox trailed it 5–0 and Sox came back and win it 10–8, which is the biggest come back so far this season. On June 24 against the Los Angeles Dodgers, Sox hit 6 home runs in one game, first time since June 8, 2004 against the Philadelphia Phillies. The homers are ones by Jermaine Dye, Paul Konerko, Jayson Nix, Alexei Ramírez, and two by Josh Fields. The Sox beat the Dodgers 10–7. In next day, the Sox defeated the Dodgers 6–5 for thirteen innings after Scott Podsednik hit a bases-loaded single and Beckham scored. The Sox took 2-out-of-3 in this series against the Dodgers, even though Dodgers had the best record of baseball. On June 27 against the Cubs, this game went back and forth. Finally, Gordon Beckham hit a walk-off RBI in the bottom of the ninth inning and Josh Fields scored to give Sox an 8–7 victory. The White Sox finished June 15–13.

July 

On July 7 against the Cleveland Indians, Paul Konerko hit his first career three home runs in one game (one grand slam and two solo home runs), first time for White Sox player since José Valentín did on July 30, 2003, at Kansas City Royals. Typically the Sox took the victory 10–6. The starting pitcher Mark Buehrle (9–3 as of July 14) went to the All-Star Game on July 14 at Busch Stadium in St. Louis. On July 17 against the Baltimore Orioles, Jim Thome hit a grand slam and a three-run homer in a same game for his career high seven RBIs. On that day, the Sox beat the Orioles 12–8. On July 21 against the Tampa Bay Rays, Carlos Quentin was activated from a 15-day disabled list, which he went 1–4. On July 23, Mark Buehrle threw a perfect game against the Tampa Bay Rays and second career no-hitter. It is only the second perfect game in White Sox history, first since 1922. It is the 18th perfect game in MLB history, first time since Randy Johnson in 2004 for the Arizona Diamondbacks. On July 31, the day of the trade deadline the White Sox traded away Clayton Richard, Aaron Poreda, Adam Russell and Dexter Carter for former Cy Young Award winner Jake Peavy from the San Diego Padres. The White Sox finished July 14–13.

August 
On August 10 the White Sox claimed Alex Ríos of the Toronto Blue Jays off waivers. Ríos is signed through 2014 for $69.35 million with a no-trade clause this year and a partial no-trade clause through the rest of his contract. On August 12 against the Seattle Mariners in Safeco Field, the score was 0–0 until Ken Griffey Jr. (former White Sox teammate) hit a walk-off single down the right field line in the fourteenth inning with men on first and second in which Adrián Beltré scored. On August 18, Freddy García picked up his first start for the White Sox since September 29, 2006. García get his loss to Kansas City Royals 5–4. On August 24 against the Boston Red Sox in third inning, José Contreras committed an error while trying to pick up a ball down the first baseline by David Ortiz to assist for a final out, which led to a season high six unearned runs and the Sox loses 12–8. On August 31 after the game, the Sox traded away Jim Thome to Los Angeles Dodgers for minor league infielder Justin Fuller and José Contreras to Colorado Rockies for minor league pitcher Brandon Hynick. The White Sox finished August 11–17.

September 
On September 2 against the Minnesota Twins at the Metrodome, the Sox trailed 2–0 before Gordon Beckham and Paul Konerko hit back-to-back home runs with 2 outs in the ninth inning when both had 3–2 accounts off of Joe Nathan. Alexei Ramírez hit an RBI single and DeWayne Wise scores, and then Carlos Quentin scored on a wild pitch to Alex Ríos, which makes it 4–2 White Sox and a huge comeback victory to avoid sweep by Twins. On September 3, the interleague game against the Cubs at Wrigley Field was made-up from June 16. The Sox shutout the Cubs 5–0, finishing this year's interleague play 12–6 for Sox and 6–9 for Cubs, both are identical to last season's interleague play. The White Sox starting pitcher Carlos Torres picked up his first major league victory after he was debuted on July 22. On September 4, the White Sox got 20 hits against the Red Sox, the most hits in a game against that team since 1960. On September 5 against the Boston Red Sox, Gavin Floyd retired the first 17 hitters (broken up by Nick Green's single with 2 outs in the 6th inning) and a career-high 11 strikeouts for 8 innings pitched, which the Sox took the victory 5–1. On September 7, Mark Buehrle picked up his first win since the perfect game on July 23. On the next day against the Oakland Athletics, Carlos Torres pitched for just ⅔ inning as he allowed 5 runs on 4 hits with 2 homers. It is the shortest outing by a Sox starter in more than six years. Typically, Sox lost to Oakland 11–3. On September 12 at Los Angeles Angels, Scott Podsednik hit an inside-the-park home run, first time for the Sox since Joe Borchard hit that on September 9, 2002, at Kansas City Royals. Typically, Sox defeated the Angels 4–3 in ten innings. On September 17 against the Mariners in Safeco, with the score 3–1 Sox lead in the bottom of the ninth inning, Bobby Jenks allowed two home runs, one by José Lopez with nobody out and one by Bill Hall with two outs, which made it 3–3. In the bottom of the fourteenth inning, Ichiro Suzuki hit a walk-off single to center field with men on first and second in which Ryan Langerhans scored. On September 19, Jake Peavy got his first start for the White Sox since he started for San Diego Padres on June 8. Peavy picked up his first victory over the Royals 13–3. On September 21–23 against the Minnesota Twins, the Sox got swept at home for a first time since August 2007 when they were swept by Red Sox. On September 26 against the Detroit Tigers after 4th inning, Sox led 5–0, Tigers came back and defeated the White Sox 12–5. With that first loss at home on Saturday this season, the Sox finished the season's home games on Saturdays 11–1. The White Sox finished September 13–14.

October 
The White Sox finished October 2–1 after winning two-out-of-three games in a series against the Detroit Tigers in Comerica Park.

Roster

Game log

Player stats

Batting 
Note: G = Games played; AB = At bats; R = Runs scored; H = Hits; 2B = Doubles; 3B = Triples; HR = Home runs; RBI = Runs batted in; AVG = Batting average; SB = Stolen bases

Pitching 
Note: W = Wins; L = Losses; ERA = Earned run average; G = Games pitched; GS = Games started; SV = Saves; IP = Innings pitched; H = Hits allowed; R = Runs allowed; ER = Earned runs allowed; BB = Walks allowed; K = Strikeouts; BAA = Batting average against

Team scoring and season summary 
 Games played: 162
 Record: 79–83
 Rank: 3rd
 Games behind: 7.5
 Biggest lead: 0.5 games (last on May 1)
 Farthest behind: 9.5 games (last on September 26)
 Most games over .500: 5 (last on July 23)
 Most games under .500: 7 (last on September 26)
 Longest winning streak: 7 games (June 27 to July 3)
 Longest losing streak: 5 games (May 13 to 18 and August 28 to September 1)
 Series sweep: 2–5
 Longest game: 14 innings (August 12 at Mariners and September 17 at Mariners)
 Shortest game: 7 innings (June 30 at Indians)
 Home record: 43–38
 Road record: 36–45
 vs. East division teams: 18–21
 vs. Central division teams: 34–38
 vs. West division teams: 15–18
 vs. American League teams: 67–77
 vs. National League teams: 12–6
 Runs scored: 724
 Runs allowed: 732
 Pythagorean record: 80–82
 Runs scored per game: 4.47
 Runs allowed per game: 4.52
 Blowout games: 23–25
 One-run games: 19–27
 9-inning games: 74–77
 Extra-inning games: 4–6
 Shortened games: 1–0
 Walk-off games: 6–9
 Shutouts: 11–13
 10+ runs scored: 14
 10+ runs allowed: 12
 Most runs scored: 17 (May 25 at Angels)
 Most runs allowed: 20 (May 21 vs Twins)

Farm system

References

External links 

 2009 Chicago White Sox season at Baseball Reference
 2009 Chicago White Sox Season Official Site
 Chicago White Sox stats

Chicago White Sox seasons
Chicago White Sox season
White